Ishikawa District can refer to two districts in Japan:
 Ishikawa District, Ishikawa
 Ishikawa District, Fukushima